Ciao! is the second studio album from the Canadian electronic DJ/producer Tiga. It was released April 27, 2009 on Tiga's own label Turbo and the international label PIAS.

Reception 

Initial critical response to Ciao! was generally positive. At Metacritic, which assigns a normalized rating out of 100 to reviews from mainstream critics, the album has received an average score of 76, based on 11 reviews.

Track listing 

All tracks co-written and co-produced by Tiga.

Singles 
"Mind Dimension" was the first released single from the album. Though "Shoes" was premiered on Tiga's Myspace page, being played more than 10,000 times in its first day. "Mind Dimension" was released with 2 versions:

Version A [2-Track Version]
 Mind Dimension 2 (6:27)
 Mind Dimension 1 (6:07)

Version B [3-Track Version]
 Mind Dimension 2 (6:22)
 Mind Dimension 1 (6:05)
 Mind Dimension (The Bloody Beetroots Remix) (3:46)

Charts

References

External links
 

2009 albums
Tiga (musician) albums